Railton may refer to:

 Railton (surname)
 Railton (car), a former marque of British automobiles
 Railton, Kentucky, a place in the US; see List of tornadoes in the Super Outbreak
 Railton, Tasmania, a town in Tasmania, Australia

See also
 Campbell-Railton, Sir Malcolm Campbell's final land speed record car
 Napier-Railton, an aero-engined race car built in 1933
 Railton Special, a motor vehicle designed by Reid Railton built for John Cobb's land speed record in 1938
 Railton Road, London, England